Lincoln Fenner is an Australian filmmaker, writer, film director, producer and film editor. He is represented by Imperial Artists Agency in London.

Fenner's completed written works include “Thomas Blackwell and The Great Siege” and “Dance of the Seahorses”.

Fenner is the writer, director and creator of “Time Rewind” the 80’s nostalgia sci-fi family time travel adventure feature-length movie set in London. Fenner also wrote and directed the Australian romantic comedy short film Paid In Full as well as time travel short drama Another Chance (2005).

Fenner is also known for his documentary: Fame Us (2019), starring David Hasselhoff, and his debut feature More 4 Me (2012).

More 4 Me (2012), won the Times Square Audience Award for Best Documentary at The New York City International Film Festival. The film, which examines greed and extreme poverty, also had an Official Screening at the Cannes Film Festival Marché du Film in 2012. AFF director Barry Watterson said: "Fenner has created a mirror where everyone who looks into it will re-evaluate what is ultimately important in their lives."

Fenner's feature film Fame Us (2019), takes a critical look at social media, fame and the cultural intersection of the two. His journey to various locations around the world saw him interview David Hasselhoff, Michael Reagan, Anthony Crivello, Tony Lo Bianco, Ralph Rieckermann and Jon Polito on the topic.

Fenner has appeared and been interviewed in Metro New York, The Sydney Morning Herald, The Australian, Today Tonight,  ABC, The Sunday Times, The Advertiser (Adelaide), 98five Sonshine FM, 6PR and The West Australian.

References 

Date of birth missing (living people)
Living people
Year of birth missing (living people)
New York Film Academy alumni